Shenandoah Mountain is a mountain ridge approximately  long in Virginia and West Virginia. The steep, narrow, sandstone-capped ridge extends from northern Bath County, Virginia to southern Hardy County, West Virginia. Along the way, its crest defines the borders between Highland and Augusta counties, Virginia, and between Pendleton County, West Virginia, and Rockingham County, Virginia. The name comes from the Iroquoian word for 'deer'.  Its high point is 4397’/1340 m Reddish Knob along the Virginia/West Virginia border.

Located in the Ridge and Valley physiographic province of the Appalachian Mountains, Shenandoah Mountain forms part of the western margin of the Shenandoah Valley, and is part of the easternmost Allegheny Mountains. It lies almost entirely within the George Washington National Forest.  U.S. Route 33 crosses the mountain between Franklin, West Virginia, and Harrisonburg, Virginia.

Other Shenandoah Mountain high peaks are Flagpole Knob (Virginia; 4383’/1336 m), and Bald Knob (Virginia; 3680’/1122 m).

See also
Shenandoah Mountain salamander

References

Ridges of Virginia
Ridges of West Virginia
Allegheny Mountains
Shenandoah River
Mountains of Rockingham County, Virginia
Mountains of Bath County, Virginia
Mountains of Augusta County, Virginia
Mountains of Highland County, Virginia
Mountains of Pendleton County, West Virginia
Ridges of Hardy County, West Virginia